Clandestinos is a 2007 Spanish film directed by Antonio Hens about a young gay male coming out of jail, and the search for his boyfriend and later involvement in ETA. Xabi was abandoned as a child and his feral life led to many spells in reform schools. After being released this time, he meets Inaki, an older man who is involved in ETA terrorism and who becomes a true friend, teacher and lover to the youth. Unfortunately, Xabi is sent to a high security correctional facility after throwing a gasoline bottle at a policeman during a robbery, injuring him severely. Xabi, along with a young Mexican and a Moroccan named Driss, both of whom are to be deported, manage to escape and get to Madrid. They are the "clandestinos" of the title. Xabi looks for Inaki as he wants to join ETA, but cannot find him.

The film premiered at the 2007 LesGaiCineMad Film Festival.

Cast
 Israel Rodríguez as Xabi
 Mehroz Arif as Driss
 Hugo Catalán as Joel
 Juanma Lara as Manuel
 Elena Martínez as Elena
 Inma Cuevas as Rebeca
 Pepa Aniorte as Marta
 Fanny de Castro as Vecina
 Luis Hostalot as Iñaki
 Ana Rayo as Edurne
 Juan Luis Galiardo as Germán
 Pablo Puyol as Lucas
 Antonio Dechent as Fermín
 Manuel Salas as Droguero
 Asun Ayllón as Ferretera
 Raúl Zajdner as Camionero
 Antonio Salazar as Guardia civil
 Aquilino Gamazo as Guardia de seguridad
 Ángeles Maeso as Repartidora de pizzas
 Juan Gea as Voz (voice)
 Maite Sandoval as (voice)
 Pablo Vega as (voice)
 Estrella Zapatero as Voz (voice)

U.S. Release 
Clandestinos was featured in the 2008 New York LGBT Film Festival.

References

External links 
 
 

2007 films
2007 drama films
Spanish drama films
Spanish LGBT-related films
2000s Spanish-language films
Films about ETA (separatist group)
2000s Spanish films